A Spot of Folly is a collection of short stories by English writer Ruth Rendell. Subtitled "Ten And A Quarter New Tales Of Murder and Mayhem" the collection was published in 2017, two years after Rendell's death. The stories in the collection had been previously published in crime fiction magazines between 1970 and 2005, most of them Ellery Queen's Mystery Magazine.

References

External links
 A Spot of Folly: Ten and a Quarter New Tales of Murder and Mayhem on Goodreads

2017 short story collections
Short story collections by Ruth Rendell
Books published posthumously
Profile Books books